William Robert Headley was an architect who is best known for his modernist railway stations for the London Midland Region of British Railways in the early 1960s.

He joined railway service in 1947, achieved his diploma of the Architectural Association in 1948 and became architect for the London Midland region of British railways. He resigned his position with British Railways and was taken into partnership with Messrs Gollins, Melvin, Ward and Partners on 1 January 1963. He gave up his partnership in 1989.

Works
Manchester Piccadilly railway station 1958-60 (rebuilding)
Wilmslow signal box 1959
Coventry railway station 1959-62 with project architect Derrick Shorten
Manchester Oxford Road railway station 1960. (with Max Clendinning)
Crewe railway station 1960
Manchester new power signal box 1960
St Helens Central railway station 1960-61 (replaced in 2007)
Stafford railway station 1961-62
Chelford railway station 1960
Euston railway station 1962-68 (with Ray Moorcroft)
New Street station signal box 1964-65  (with Bicknell & Hamilton)
East Didsbury railway station

References

20th-century English architects
British railway architects
British Rail people
Alumni of the Architectural Association School of Architecture
Possibly living people